Ecuador is scheduled to compete at the 2017 World Aquatics Championships in Budapest, Hungary from 14 July to 30 July.

Medalists

Open water swimming

Ecuador has entered seven open water swimmers

Swimming

Ecuadorian swimmers have achieved qualifying standards in the following events (up to a maximum of 2 swimmers in each event at the A-standard entry time, and 1 at the B-standard):

References

Nations at the 2017 World Aquatics Championships
Ecuador at the World Aquatics Championships
2017 in Ecuadorian sport